Griswold may refer to:

People and fictional characters
 Griswold (surname), a list of people and fictional characters
 Griswold family, an American political family

Places

Canada
 Griswold, Manitoba
 Griswold Pass, British Columbia, a mountain pass

United States
 Griswold, Connecticut, a town
 Griswold, Iowa, a city
 Griswold, Missouri, an unincorporated community
 Griswold, New York, a hamlet in the town of Arkwright
 Griswold Street, Detroit, Michigan
 Fort Griswold, Groton, Connecticut
 Griswold Lake (Nevada)
 Griswold Creek, California
 Griswold Hills, California, United States, a mountain range
 Griswold Scout Reservation, New Hampshire

Facilities and structures
 Griswold Airport, Madison, Connecticut
 Griswold High School (disambiguation)
 Griswold Stadium, Portland, Oregon, United States, a football and soccer stadium for Lewis & Clark College
 Griswold Building, original name of The Albert (Detroit), a former office building on the National Register of Historic Places
 Griswold House (disambiguation)

Vehicles
 Griswold (automobile), manufactured in Detroit in 1907
 USS Griswold (DE-7), a World War II US Navy ship
 Media (AK-83), a World War II ship transferred to the US Army and renamed Glenn Gerald Griswold

Brands, businesses, groups, organizations
 The Griswolds, an Australian two-piece indie rock band
 Griswold (revolver), a firearm produced at Griswoldville, Georgia, for Confederate forces during the American Civil War
 Griswold Manufacturing, an American manufacturer of cast iron home products based in Erie, Pennsylvania, that operated from 1865 until 1957 
 Griswold Signal Company, a manufacturer of traffic signals and railroad grade crossing signals based in Minneapolis, Minnesota
 The Griswold Inn, the oldest continuously-run tavern in the United States, located in Essex, Connecticut

Other uses
 Griswold v. Connecticut, widely known as "Griswold"; landmark 1965 US Supreme Court case invalidating law prohibiting the use of contraception

See also

 Hepburn v. Griswold, 1870 US Supreme Court case declaring certain parts of the legal tender acts unconstitutional
 J. Griswold Webb (1890–1934), American politician